The Yale Bowl Stadium is a college football stadium in the northeast United States, located in New Haven, Connecticut, on the border of West Haven, about 1½ miles (2½ km) west of the main campus of Yale University. The home of the American football team of the Yale Bulldogs of the Ivy League, it opened in 1914 with 70,896 seats; renovations have reduced its current capacity to 61,446, still making it the second largest FCS stadium, behind Tennessee State's Nissan Stadium.
The Yale Bowl Stadium inspired the design and naming of the Rose Bowl, from which is derived the name of college football's post-season games (bowl games) and the NFL's Super Bowl.

In 1973 and 1974, the stadium hosted the New York Giants of the National Football League, as Yankee Stadium was renovated into a baseball-only venue and Giants Stadium was still in the planning and construction stages; the team was able to move to Shea Stadium in 1975.

History 

Ground was broken on the stadium in August 1913. Fill excavated from the field area was used to build up a berm around the perimeter to create an elliptical bowl. The facade was designed to partially echo the campus's Neo-Gothic design, and, as with some central campus buildings, acid was applied to imitate the effects of aging.

It was the first bowl-shaped stadium in the country, and inspired the design of such stadiums as the Rose Bowl, the Los Angeles Memorial Coliseum, and Michigan Stadium.  It was declared a National Historic Landmark in 1987 for its role in football history.

The Yale Bowl's designer, Charles A. Ferry, for unknown reasons chose not to include locker rooms  Players dress in the Smilow Field Center and walk  to the field.  When the NFL's Giants played at the stadium (1973, 1974), the pro players disliked the arrangement, but Yale players reportedly enjoy the walk. Fans cheer for the team as it marches to the stadium while the Yale Band plays, a tradition known as the "Bulldog Walk."

The Bowl's first game, on November 21, 1914, drew more than 68,000 spectators, who watched the Bulldogs lose 36–0 to rival Harvard.

In 1958, a new scoreboard was installed; its distinctive clock was arranged vertically instead of horizontally.

During the 1970s, the Bowl hosted several concerts. In 1971, Yes performed on July 24 and the Grateful Dead on July 31, a recording of which was released as Road Trips Volume 1 Number 3. But neighborhood opposition to the concerts brought them to an end after a June 14, 1980, show featuring the Eagles, Heart, and The Little River Band.  A picture from the show was published with the vinyl edition of the Eagles double live album, issued later that year, though no recordings from the event are included on the discs.  A Paul McCartney concert was scheduled for June 1990, but cancelled amid neighbors' opposition; the show was moved to Chicago.

The stadium has hosted many soccer matches over the years; it served as home field for the Connecticut Bicentennials of the North American Soccer League during the 1976 and 1977 seasons.  Yale Bowl was mulled as a possible playing site when the United States hosted the World Cup in 1994, but lost out to Foxboro Stadium in Massachusetts and Giants Stadium in New Jersey.

In 1991, the Bowl's vicinity saw the addition of the Cullman-Heyman Tennis Center, home to the annual ATP/WTA event (the Pilot Pen tournament), across Yale Avenue from the stadium.

On October 5, 2001, the closing ceremony of the Yale Tercentennial was held at the Yale Bowl.  Guests included Tom Wolfe '57, William F. Buckley '50, Sesame Streets Big Bird, Paul Simon '96 Hon, and Garry Trudeau '70.

By the 21st century, many of the outside retaining walls and portal entries were deteriorating. In the spring and summer of 2006, the bowl received a partial renovation, including a new scoreboard. The work was completed just in time for the first home game of the Yale football team's season on September 16.

Sports

Football

NFL
The New York Giants of the National Football League won just one of the dozen home games they played in New Haven in the 1973 and 1974 seasons. (With the exception of the games played with replacement teams during the 1987 NFL strike, the attendance at the final game at the Yale Bowl is the smallest at a Giants' home game since 1955.) The team also played preseason games in the stadium, including the first ever game against its future rival and stadium share partner, the New York Jets, in 1969.

Soccer

International

NASL (1976-1977)

Gallery

See also
List of NCAA Division I FCS football stadiums
List of National Historic Landmarks in Connecticut
National Register of Historic Places listings in New Haven, Connecticut

References

External links

 

College football venues
American football venues in Connecticut
Yale Bulldogs football
Yale University buildings
National Historic Landmarks in Connecticut
Defunct National Football League venues
New York Giants stadiums
Tourist attractions in New Haven, Connecticut
Sports venues completed in 1914
Sports venues in New Haven, Connecticut
Event venues on the National Register of Historic Places in Connecticut
North American Soccer League (1968–1984) stadiums
National Register of Historic Places in New Haven, Connecticut
Sports venues on the National Register of Historic Places
1914 establishments in Connecticut
Soccer venues in Connecticut